Gary Hamilton may refer to:
 Gary Hamilton (footballer, born 1980), football player from Northern Ireland
 Gary Hamilton (footballer, born 1965), Scottish football player for Middlesbrough and Darlington
 Gary G. Hamilton, American television journalist
 Gary Hamilton (basketball) (born 1986), American basketball player
 Gary Hamilton (kickboxer) (born 1980), Northern Ireland's kickboxer